The city of Leeuwarden, Friesland, the Netherlands has had at least 130 windmills over the centuries. Only one, the Froskepôlemolen survives today within Leeuwarden. Six other mills which have stood in Leeuwarden survive elsewhere in the Netherlands. The mills had a wide range of industrial and agricultural uses. The industrial uses include the processing of bark for tanning leather, the fulling of cloth, the production of cement, the production of dyes, the extraction of oil (including the production of paints),  the grinding of tobacco to produce snuff, the production of gunpowder, and the sawing of timber. Agricultural uses include the milling of buckwheat, oats, rye and wheat, the processing of chicory, the production of pearl barley, and the pumping of water.

Surviving windmills

Froskepôlemolen

The grondzeiler Huizumer en Goutum Nieuwlandmolen was moved to a new site within Leeuwarden in 1962. The mill is a drainage mill, and is maintained in working order.

Windmills with surviving remains

De Haan
The stellingmolen De Haan was built before 1685. It was a fulling mill. In 1749 it was converted to a barley mill. In 1832 it was converted to an oil mill, at which time it was known as De Haan. After 1848 it was also a cement mill. The mill was standing in 1878, but had been demolished by 1903 leaving the base which survives, having survived a threat of demolition in 2003.

De Eendracht, (oil and barley mill)

De Eendracht was a stellingmolen which built before 1786 as a barley and oat hulling mill. It was later converted to an oil mill. In 1888, the smock was moved to Anjum, where it was erected on a new brick base. The mill stands today, known as De Eendracht. At Leeuwarden, the original base of De Eendracht survives. Following a fire in 2014, a proposal was made in November 2015 to build a new smock on the existing base. The building would be used for residential purposes. The new steel-framed smock and cap, with dummy sails, was lifted onto the base on 6 March 2018.

Windmills formerly in Leeuwarden which survive elsewhere

De Phenix

The mill was a sawmill. In 1917 it was moved to Marrum, where it stands today known as De Phenix, converted to a drainage mill.

De Jonge
De Jonge was a stellingmolen which was built in 1871. It was an oil mill. A steam engine was installed in 1878. In 1887, the mill was moved to Marle, Overijssel, where it was converted to a corn mill. The mill survives and is known as De Vlijt.

Himriksmolen
It was a drainage mill. On 13 November 1972, the mill was badly damaged in a storm. Due to boundary changes the mill's location became part of Leeuwarden, and then reverted to Tytsjerk. On 30 June 1995, the mill was burnt down in an arson attack. The mill was restored in 1996, and is known as De Himriksmole or De Groene Ster.

Huizumer en Goutumer Nieuwlandmolen

In 1962, the mill was moved to a new site within Leeuwarden, where it is known as the Froskepôlemolen.

Molen aan de Nieuwe Kanaal

It was a barley mill, and later an oil mill and bark mill. Last recorded at Leeuwarden in 1786, the mill was later moved to Heerenveen, where it was known as De Fortuyn. The mill was moved to Hankate, Overijssel in 1892, taking the name Molen van Kappert. In 1916, the mill was moved to Veenoord, Drenthe, and took the name Nooitdgedacht. The mill still stands in Veenoord.

Vanished windmills

Cammingha-Buurstermolen

The mill was working until 1947 when a  electric motor was installed. In 1958, the mill was bought by the Gemeente Leeuwarden for ƒ5. It was restored by millwright De Roos of Leeuwarden. The sails were removed the early 1990s. On 11 May 1994, the mill was the victim of an arson attack. The remains of the mill were demolished in 2000.

De Arend (standerdmolen)
The first mill on this site was a standerdmolen which was moved from the Noordvliet in 1621. Located on the city walls at Vrouwenpoortsdwinger, . It was still standing in 1664.

De Arend (stellingmolen)
The standerdmolen was later replaced by a stellingmolen on the same site which served as a corn mill. It was called De Arend. The mill was purchased by the Gemeente Leeuwarden in 1895 and demolished in 1901. It was the last windmill to stand on the city walls.

De Basuin
De Basuin was a stellingmolen which was built in 1849 to the south of the railway station at the junction of Hollanderwijk and Wassenberghstraat, . The mill was a corn and barley mill. It was demolished in 1913, leaving the base standing. This was demolished in September 1978.

De Boer, De Hersteller
The mill was built in 1672. it was known as De Boer until 1823, then  De Hersteller until 1848, when it burnt down. It was replaced by a new stellingmolen which was  named De Phenix or De Phoenix.

De Drie Gouden Kronen
De Drie Gouden Kronen was a stellingmolen which was built in 1770. It was an oil mill. A steam engine was added in 1881 and the mill was demolished in 1891. The foundation stone of the mill has been preserved.

De Eendracht (1st sawmill)
The first sawmill named De Eendracht was a  stellingmolen which was built between 1718 and 1739. The mill burnt down on 18 May 1878.

De Eendracht (2nd sawmill)
The second sawmill named De Eendracht was a stellingmolen which originally stood at Zaandam-Oost, North Holland where it had been built in 1787 and was a sawmill known as De Bakker. It replaced the earlier mill which had burnt down, standing on the same site, . It was demolished in 1919.

De Eenhorn, Wijninghahornster Mollen, Dye Molen voor Wirdumerpoerte
De Eenhorn ) was a standerdmolen. The first mention of a mill on this site was in 1496, when it was known as the Wijninghahornster Mollen In 1516, the mill was in use as a dye mill, then being known as the Dye Molen voor Wirdumerpoerte. By 1582, the mill was in use as a corn mill. The rye and wheat mill De Eenhorn was sold in June 1837, this being the last evidence of its existence.

De Fortuin (standerdmolen)
It was a corn mill built between 1580 and 1603. The mill was demolished c1760 and replaced with a stellingmolen.

De Fortuin (stellingmolen)
The stellingmolen known as De Fortuin (}) was also a corn mill. It was moved within Leeuwarden in 1873, taking the name Het Fortuin at its new site.

De Herderin, De Blauwe Molen
This stellingmolen was moved from Zaanstreek, North Holland in 1830. There, it was a paper mill known as De Herderin. The mill was also known as De Blauwe Molen due to it having been moved to Leeuwarden by a millwright by the name of De Blauwe. The mill was an oil mill, it was moved c1892 to Minnertsga, where it was a corn mill known as De Welkomst. The mill was demolished in 1947.

De Hersteller
De Hersteller was a stellingmolen which was built in 1819. The mill was demolished in 1903.

De Hoop, Groote Weijdmolen, 's Pinsenweitmolen
The first mill on this site was a standerdmolen which had been moved from Het Schravernek in 1624. De Hoop was a stellingmolen which was a corn mill. It was also known as Groote Weijdmolen or s Prinsenweitmolen. It was demolished  in 1885.

Deinumerpoldermolen
The Deinumerpoldermolen or Deinumer Nieuwmanspoldermolen was a grondzeiler which was built in 1774 by millwright Frans Beernts of Leeuwarden to drain the approximately  Deinumer Nieumanspolder. The mill was demolished in 1918 and an electrically driven pump was erected in its place.

De Jong Fenix (forerunner)
A standerdmolen was moved from within Leeuwarden c1642. The mill was a corn mill, it burnt down in 1752.

De Jong Fenix, De Stenen Molen
De Jong Fenix was a stellingmolen which served as a bark mill, and oil mill and a cement mill. The mill was built in 1752 on the site of the post mill which had burnt down. It was also known as De Stenen Molen. The mill was demolished in 1904, but the foundation stone has been preserved and can be seen in the Fries Museum, Leeuwarden.

De Kat
De Kat was a stellingmolen which was built in 1699 as a barley mill. In 1739, the mill was rebuilt as an oil mill. It was demolished in 1903.

De Kroon
De Kroon was a stellingmolen which was built in 1760 as a snuff and paint mill. The mill was converted to a gunpowder and oil mill. In 1822 it was used only as an oil mill. It was demolished in 1914.

De Kroon, De Steenbikmolen
De Kroon or De Steenbikmolen was a stellingmolen which was built between 1884 and 1887. The mill was probably a drainage mill originally, but was later converted to a stamping mill. The mill was standing in 1896 but was struck by lightning at an unknown date, losing its sails. The mill was then demolished, it had gone by 1905.

De Leeuw (standerdmolen)
The first mill on the site occupied by De Leeuw was a standerdmolen built in 1622. It burnt down in 1689.

De Leeuw (stellingmolen)
In 1690, a stellingmolen was erected in the place of the mill which had burnt down. This mill was known as De Leeuw;. The mill was bought by the Gemeente Leeuwarden in 1882 and demolished that same year.

De Morgenster
De Morgenster was a stellingmolen which was built in 1842 to replace a horse mill. The mill was a chicory, rye, and barley mill, as well as a drainage mill. It was demolished in 1861, and probably moved to an unknown location.

De Paltrok, De Poltrok
The eponymous De Paltrok or De Poltrok was a paltrokmolen which was built between 1718 and 1735. The mill was a sawmill it was demolished in 1812.

De Rosenboom (standerdmolen)
The first mill on the site later occupied by De Rosenboom was a standerdmolen which was marked on a map dated 1664. The mill was demolished c1750, and replaced by an achtkantmolen, which was built in 1751.

De Rosenboom (achtkantmolen)
The mill was demolished in 1862 as it lay on the route of the railway that was being built between Leeuwarden and Groningen. The mill was moved to Hantum, where it was known as De Rosenboom. On 1 March 1949, the cap and sails were blown off the mill. In 1958, the smock was placed on the ground and used as a garage and store. It was demolished in 1970. A millstone from De Rosenboom is preserved in De Hoop, Holwerd.

De Visser, De Visker, Molen de Van de Wint, Molen van Timmermans

A windmill was built on this site in 1662. This mill had a wooden windshaft. It was probably replaced in 1740 by a new mill. De Visser or De Fisker was a stellingmolen. It was named after its owners, who were the Fiske family in the mid-nineteenth century. The mill was later owned by De Wint from 1871. The mill was dismantled in 1910, and a  electric motor installed. The smock was left standing. De Wint died in 1933, and the mill was owned by Timmermans in 1947. On 16 January 1964, the mill was burnt down, although at the time there were plans to demolish it as it stood on the route of a bypass that was planned to be built around Leeuwarden.

De Vrijheid, De Hoop, Het Haantje
De Vrijheid was a stellingmolen which was standing in 1664. Originally a sawmill, it was rebuilt as an oil mill in 1798, and was then known as Het Haantje. The mill was also known as De Hoop. A  steam engine was installed in 1871. The mill burnt down in 1884.

Eekmolen van het Gild de Groote Looijers
Built before 1664, this bark mill was standing in 1680 but had been demolished by 1718. The mill was owned by Het Gild de Groote Looijers in 1680.

Het Fortuin
Het Fortuin was a stellingmolen that was moved here in 1873. A  steam engine was installed in 1883. The mill burnt down on 24 March 1886, leaving the base standing. In 1888, a steam-powered factory was erected, but the windmill was not replaced. The base survived until c1900.

Het Fortuin, Oude Molen
A windmill was marked on a map of 1685 in the position later occupied by Het Fortuin. It was then known as the Oude Molen, and possibly was of sixteenth century date. The mill stood close to Emmakade on the Nieuwe Kanaal at. Originally an oil mill, in 1786 the mill was a bark mill. The stellingmolen was standing in 1895.

Het Lam (1st site, standerdmolen)
A standerdmolen stood on this site in 1595. It was a corn, rye and buckwheat mill. The mill was demolished c1790.

Het Lam (1st site, stellingmolen)
Het Lam was a stellingmolen which was built in 1791 on the site of the standerdmolen demolished c1790. Het Lam was a corn and buckwheat mill. The mill was badly damaged in a storm in 1829. It was moved to a new site within Leeuwarden in 1830.

Het Lam (2nd site)
A gas engine was installed in 1898, and in 1901 the mill was one of the first in Friesland equipped with Patent sails, which were fitted by millwright J H Westra of Franeker. The mill was a corn and barley mill. It was demolished in 1919, leaving the lower part of the base standing. This was demolished in 1988.

Kleijne Weijdemolen
The mill was a corn mill. It was demolished in 1752.

Korenmolen aan het Vliet
It was a corn mill, which was moved to Vrouwenpoortsdwinger in 1621, where it stood on the site later occupied by De Arend.

Korenmolen van de Leeuwarder Blokhuis
A mill of unknown type was built in 1547 to replace a horse mill.

Leermolen aan het Vliet
An achtkantmolen was standing in 1685 to the south of Het Vliet. It was advertised for sale in 1841, described as suitable to be moved. The base was standing in 1887.

Leermolen van Claas Feddes
This mill was probably an achtkantmolen. It was standing in 1685. It was standing in 1832 but had gone by 1850.

Molen op het Schravernek
It was moved in 1624 to a site in Leeuwarden later occupied by De Hoop.

Molen van Baron Rengers
It was a drainage mill. The first mention of the mill was in 1832 and it was still standing in 1850.

Molen van Cornelis Westra (I)
It was a drainage mill. The first mention of the mill was in 1832 and it was still standing in 1850.

Molen van Cornelis Westra (II)
It was a drainage mill. The first mention of the mill was in 1832 and it was still standing in 1850.

Molen van Dirk Jonker
It was a drainage mill. The first mention of the mill was in 1832 and it was still standing in 1850.

Molen van Douwe van der Kooi
It was a drainage mill. The first mention of the mill was in 1832 and it was demolished c1850.

Molen van Hermanus Wesselius
It was a drainage mill. The first mention of the mill was in 1832 and it was demolished c1880.

Molen van Justinus Rengers
It was a drainage mill. The first mention of the mill was in 1832 and it was still standing in 1930.

Molen van Klaas Tigler
It was a drainage mill. The first mention of the mill was in 1832 and it was still standing in 1850.

Molen van Pieter Cats
It was a drainage mill. The first mention of the mill was in 1832 and it had been demolished by 1850.

Molen van Tiete Tromp
It was a drainage mill. The first mention of the mill was in 1832 and it had been demolished by 1850.

Molen van Tjeerd Kastra
It was a drainage mill. The first mention of the mill was in 1832 and it may have been still standing in 1850.

Pelmolen van Gerrit Gorter
This mill was probably an achtkantmolen. It was a barley mill. The mill was built between 1685 and 1700. In 1856 it was converted to a corn mill. A steam engine was installed in 1872 and it was demolished c1885.

Pelmolen van Jentje Wijbrandt
This mill was a wipstellingmolen. It was a barley mill. The mill was built between 1685 and 1718. In 1882 it was demolished as a steam-powered mill had been erected.

Pelmolen van Tiede Dijkstra
This mill was a wipstellingmolen. It was a barley mill. The mill was built in 1742. In 1847 it was converted to an oil mill, and then to a corn mill in 1855. It burnt down in 1889.

Poldermolen Het Wirdumer Nieuwland
The mill was built before 1832. It was still standing in 1929.

Poldermolen Nr.10
It was a drainage mill. The first mention of the mill was in 1832 and it was still standing in 1850.

Poldermolen Nr.11
It was a drainage mill. The first mention of the mill was in 1832 and it was demolished in 1949.

Poldermolen Nr.12
It was a drainage mill. The first mention of the mill was in 1832 and had been demolished by 1850.

Poldermolen Nr.12a
It was a drainage mill. The first mention of the mill was in 1854 and had been demolished by 1926.

Poldermolen Nr. 15
The mill was built before 1832 and had been demolished by 1928.

Poldermolen Nr. 16
The mill was built before 1832 and was demolished by 1933.

Poldermolen Nr. 16a
The mill was built before 1832 and was still standing in 1928.

Poldermolen Nr.17
It was a drainage mill. The first mention of the mill was in 1832 and it was still standing in 1850.

Poldermolen Nr.18
It was a drainage mill. The first mention of the mill was in 1832 and it was still standing in 1930.

Poldermolen Nr. 19
The mill was built before 1832 and was still standing in 1930.

Poldermolen Nr.19a
It was a drainage mill. The first mention of the mill was in 1832 and it was still standing in 1850.

Poldermolen Nr. 20
The mill was built before 1832. It was badly damaged in a storm on 1 March 1949.

Poldermolen Nr. 21
The mill was built before 1832. It was demolished in 1894.

Poldermolen Nr.21a
It was a drainage mill. The first mention of the mill was in 1832 and it probably demolished c1894 when the Nieuwe Vaart was constructed.

Poldermolen Nr.21b
It was a drainage mill. The first mention of the mill was in 1832 and it was demolished  prior to 1930.

Poldermolen Nr. 22, Cammingasterpoldermolen
The mill was built before 1832 and burnt down c1948. It latterly worked with on pair of Common sails and one pair of Patent sails.

Poldermolen Nr.23
It was a drainage mill. The first mention of the mill was in 1832 and it had been demolished by 1926.

Poldermolen Nr.24
It was a drainage mill. The first mention of the mill was in 1832 and it was still standing in 1850.

Poldermolen Nr. 25, Molen van de Potmargepolders
The mill was built before 1832 and was demolished in August 1929.

Poldermole Nr.26
It was a drainage mill. The first mention of the mill was in 1832 and it was still standing in 1930.

Poldermolen Nr.27, Boonstra's Polder Molen

The mill was dismantled in 1937 after an  electric motor had been installed. The remains of the mill were still standing in May 1978, but had been cleared by 1995, when Friese Molens was published.

Poldermolen Nr. 27a
The mill was built before 1832 and it was still standing in 1928.

Poldermolen Nr.28
It was a drainage mill. The first mention of the mill was in 1832. It had been replaced by a windmotor by 1930.

Poldermolen Nr. 29
The mill was built before 1832. It was demolished c1951.

Poldermolen Nr.30
It was a drainage mill. The first mention of the mill was in 1832 and it was still standing in 1850.

Poldermolen Nr. 30a
The mill was built before 1832. It was demolished c1929.

Poldermolen Nr.31, Old Feitmanspolder Molen
It was a drainage mill. The mill was built in 1880 and it was demolished c1975.

Poldermolen Nr.32
It was a drainage mill. The first mention of the mill was in 1832 and it was still standing in 1850.

Poldermolen Nr.33
It was a drainage mill. The first mention of the mill was in 1832 and it was still standing in 1850.

Poldermolen Nr. 34, Teernserpoldermolen
An earlier mill may have stood here between 1832 and 1854. The date that the mill was built is unknown. It was dismantled in 1948 and the smock was demolished in 1975.

Poldermolen Nr. 35
An earlier mill stood on the site in 1811. The mill was built c1850. It was demolished in 1915.

Poldermolen Nr.36
It was a drainage mill. The first mention of the mill was in 1832 and it was still standing in 1850.

Poldermolen Nr. 36
Poldermolen Nr. 36 was a spinnenkopmolen which was built to the west of the Wirdummervaart, a little to the north of Goutum. The mill was built before 1864. It was demolished in the winter of 1928/29.

Poldermolen Nr.37
It was a drainage mill. The first mention of the mill was in 1832 and it was still standing in 1850.

Poldermolen Nr.38
It was a drainage mill. The first mention of the mill was in 1832 and it was still standing in 1850.

Poldermolen Nr.39
It was a drainage mill. The first mention of the mill was in 1832 and it was still standing in 1850.

Poldermolen Nr. 40
The mill was built before 1832. It was standing in 1929.

Poldermolen Nr. 40a
The mill was built before 1832. It was standing in 1929.

Poldermolen Nr. 41
The mill was built before 1832. It was demolished in 1972, leaving the base standing. This was demolished in 2000.

Poldermolen Nr.42
It was a drainage mill. The first mention of the mill was in 1832 and it was still standing in 1850.

Poldermolen Nr.42
It was a drainage mill. The first mention of the mill was in 1832 and it was demolished in 1892.

Poldermolen Nr.43
It was a drainage mill. The first mention of the mill was in 1832 and it was still standing in 1850.

Poldermolen Nr. 44
The mill was built before 1832. It had been demolished by 1928.

Poldermolen Nr.44a
It was a drainage mill. The first mention of the mill was in 1832 and it was still standing in 1850.

Poldermolen Nr. 45
The mill was built before 1832. It was still standing in 1926.

Poldermolen Nr. 45
An earlier mill was marked on a map of 1832. The date this mill was built is not known, but may have been c1850. It had been demolished by 1928.

Poldermolen Nr. 46
The mill was built before 1832. It had been demolished by 1928.

Poldermolen Nr. 48
The mill was built before 1832. It was still standing in 1929.

Poldermolen Nr. 49
The mill was built before 1832. It was demolished c1928.

Poldermolen Nr. 50
The mill was built after 1850. It was still standing in 1929.

Poldermolen Nr. 50a
The mill was built between 1832 and 1850. It was still standing in 1929.

Poldermolen Nr. 50b
The mill was built after 1850. It was still standing in 1930.

Poldermolen Nr. 51
The mill was built between 1832 and 1850. It was still standing in 1929.

Zaagmolen van Jildert Romein
The mill was built in 1840 and was burnt down in 1858.

Unnamed mills
A standerdmolen was built to the north of Leeuwarden before 1565 and stood until at least 1786. It was a corn mill.

A standerdmolen was built to the north of Leeuwarden before 1565 and stood until at least 1718, but had gone by 1786. The mill was a corn and barley mill.

The mill may have been a corn mill. It had been demolished by 1622.

A mill of unknown type was built c1603 and removed by 1616. This mill had been moved by 1642 to a new site in Leeuwarden (see De Jong Fenix).

It drained a  polder. An electric motor was installed in the mid 1930s and the mill was demolished in 1937, the base surviving a few years longer.

A mill of unknown type was built to the south of the Bonkevaart at  sometime after 1850. It was a drainage mill and had been demolished by 1930.

It was built before 1850. It was a drainage mill and had been demolished by 1928.

The mill was built before 1718. It was a drainage mill and had been demolished by 1832.

A mill of unknown type stood at Snekkerburen, on the west side of the Dokkummer Ee, . The mill was built before 1718. It was a drainage mill and had been demolished by 1832.

It was a corn mill that was standing in 1542. The mill stood in the grounds of the Sint Anthonie Gasthuis. It was advertised for sale for demolition in 1790 but may have stood until 1798 when a mill on the Vliet was sold to miller F B Schaafsma.

A mill of unknown type was built in 1856. It was a chicory mill. A steam engine was installed in 1869 and the mill was probably demolished shortly after. It was owned by Fabrikaat M A Bokma de Boer.

A mill of unknown type was built in 1842. It was a chicory mill. A steam engine was installed in 1855 and the mill was demolished shortly afterwards. It was owned by W ter Horst.

A mill of unknown type stood on the south side of the Vrouwenpoortsdwinger, . The mill was built before 1565 and was demolished between 1664 and 1685.

References

Sources

Windmills in Friesland
Buildings and structures in Leeuwarden